Kleinmaischeid  is a municipality in the district of Neuwied, in Rhineland-Palatinate, Germany.

Between 1 May 2004 and 31 December 2006, it was the centre point of the European Union. South of Kleinmaischeid lies Großmaischeid.

References

Neuwied (district)